Göran Norlén (1931-2020) was an international speedway rider from Sweden.

Speedway career 
Norlén was one of speedway's leading riders during the 1950s, he was the champion of Sweden, winning the Swedish Championship in 1953.

References 

1931 births
2020 deaths
Swedish speedway riders